John F. Forward Sr. (October 3, 1851 – December 24, 1926) was an American Republican politician  from California.

Forward was born 1851 in Pittsburgh, Pennsylvania to Walter and Elizabeth Forward. His grandfather Walter Forward was U. S. Secretary of the Treasury.
In 1866 he started work as a machinist and continued for seven years.
He then joined the Pennsylvania Railroad as a fireman.

Forward married Ella Dillon November 1874 in Pittsburgh, and they had seven children:
John F. Forward Jr., who was also mayor, James D., Annie D., Walter L., Joseph C., Frank G., and Charles Hamilton Forward Sr., attorney, and partner in Luce Forward law firm in San Diego, grandson Charles H. Forward Jr. of Hanalei Hawaii, and great-grandson Charles H. Forward III of Honolulu Hawaii.

Forward came to San Diego in 1887. In San Diego he worked in the San Diego County's recorder office for 19 years, and, from 1892, headed the office for 14 of those years.

In 1903 Forward founded Union Title and Trust Company and, after resigning as recorder, directed it for nine years as its president.

Forward was mayor of San Diego during 1907–1909. He was elected on an anti-establishment campaign with only 39% of the vote. Since that time, runoffs have been required if nobody receives a majority of the vote for mayor.

Forward was a prominent citizen, "staunch republican", and strongly supported unions as the "salvation of the working man."

Forward died 1926 aged 75 in San Diego.

Further reading
 ,  v. 2, pp. 26–27: "John F. Forward Sr."
  Biography, p. 23. Includes portrait

Mayors of San Diego
1851 births
1926 deaths
California Republicans
Politicians from Pittsburgh